Grozny (masculine), Groznaya (feminine), or Groznoye (neuter) is the name of several inhabited localities in Russia:

Urban localities
Grozny, a city and the capital of the Chechen Republic

Rural localities
Grozny (Pobedenskoye Rural Settlement), Maykopsky District, Republic of Adygea, a khutor in Maykopsky District of the Republic of Adygea; municipally, a part of Pobedenskoye Rural Settlement of that district; 
Grozny (Kirovskoye Rural Settlement), Maykopsky District, Republic of Adygea, a khutor in Maykopsky District of the Republic of Adygea; municipally, a part of Kirovskoye Rural Settlement of that district; 
Grozny, Novozybkovsky District, Bryansk Oblast, a settlement in Vereshchaksky Rural Administrative Okrug of Novozybkovsky District in Bryansk Oblast; 
Grozny, Pogarsky District, Bryansk Oblast, a settlement in Prirubkinsky Rural Administrative Okrug of Pogarsky District in Bryansk Oblast; 
Grozny, Oryol Oblast, a settlement in Gostomlsky Selsoviet of Kromskoy District in Oryol Oblast